Jorden is a surname. Notable people with the surname include:
Edward Jorden (1569–1633), English physician and chemist
Edwin J. Jorden (1863–1903), American politician; congressman from Pennsylvania
Eleanor Jorden (1920–2009), American linguistics scholar and Japanese language educator; wife of William
James Jorden (contemporary), American journalist, music critic, and opera director
Tim Jorden (born 1966), American professional football player
William Jorden (1923–2009), American news correspondent, ambassador, and author; husband of Eleanor